Adel Eid (born 22 March 1984) is a former professional footballer who played as a centre-back. His father is Egyptian and his mother Finnish.

Career 
The defender, who is 5'11" tall and weighs 159 pounds, previously played for FC Honka and HJK Helsinki. His main role is as the centre-back or defensive midfielder within his team's first eleven.

Honours 
2 Finnish League with HJK Helsinki

References 

1984 births
Egyptian footballers
Egyptian expatriate footballers
Living people
Atlantis FC players
Helsingin Jalkapalloklubi players
FC Honka players
Ponnistus Helsinki players
Finnish people of Egyptian descent
Association football defenders
Käpylän Pallo players
Footballers from Helsinki
Ykkönen players
Kakkonen players
Veikkausliiga players
21st-century Finnish people
21st-century Egyptian people